Rogatien Rosaire "Rogie" Vachon (born September 8, 1945) is a Canadian former professional ice hockey goaltender who played for the Montreal Canadiens, Los Angeles Kings, Detroit Red Wings and Boston Bruins in the National Hockey League between 1967 and 1982.

Montreal Canadiens
Vachon entered the National Hockey League in 1966-67 with the Montreal Canadiens, as a backup goaltender to Gump Worsley. He played only 19 games during the season, but played most of the games in the playoffs and led the Canadiens to the Stanley Cup Finals. They lost to the Toronto Maple Leafs, but Vachon now had a permanent spot on the Canadiens roster. Punch Imlach, the coach of the Leafs, referred to Vachon as a junior B goaltender in an attempt to rattle him during the Stanley Cup finals.

Vachon played 39 games in the 1967–68 season and won 23 of them.  He and Worsley shared the Vezina Trophy, with a combined 2.26 GAA, the lowest since 1958-59. Montreal won the Stanley Cup that season and in 1968–69 as well. During the 1969–70 season, Worsley was traded to the Minnesota North Stars and Vachon got the starting job, but the Canadiens missed the playoffs.  Early in 1971–72, after losing the starting job to rookie Ken Dryden, Vachon demanded to be traded and he was soon sent to the Los Angeles Kings in exchange for Denis DeJordy, Dale Hoganson, Noel Price and Doug Robinson.

Los Angeles Kings
It was with the Kings that Vachon had the finest moments of his NHL career. He was runner-up for the Vezina Trophy in 1974–75, and he was named to the NHL second All-Star team in 1974-75 and 1976-77.  He was named the team MVP four times between 1973 and 1977. In one game in 1976–77, it appeared he was due credit for scoring a goal when the New York Islanders scored on themselves during a delayed penalty; however, after video review, the goal was credited to Vic Venasky after it was determined that Vachon was the second-to-last Kings player to touch the puck before it went in the net. Vachon also set many goaltending records in Kings history that still stand. His number 30 was the first number retired by the Kings, in a ceremony on February 14, 1985.  He has since served in a variety of executive positions with the Kings organization.

Canada Cup
In 1976, Vachon was chosen to play for Canada, along with fellow goaltenders Gerry Cheevers and Glenn Resch.  He was given the top spot and played in every game of the tournament. He recorded six wins and one loss, two shutouts and a 1.39 goals against average. Canada won the tournament, and Vachon was selected for the All-Star team and named team MVP.

Detroit Red Wings
Vachon became a restricted free agent following the 1977–78 season and signed with the Detroit Red Wings. The five-year deal paid Vachon $1.9 million and made him the league's highest paid goaltender. Vachon struggled from the beginning in Detroit.  In his first game, he managed just nine saves against 14 shots in a game Detroit lost 5-4. As the year wore on, things did not improve for Vachon.  Red Wings coach Bobby Kromm told Sports Illustrated: "When we signed Vachon, we thought we'd improved our club and give ourselves as good a 1-2 goaltending punch as there was in hockey. But it hasn't worked out that way." Further complicating things was the distraction that Vachon's signing created for the hockey club.  Because he was a restricted free agent, the Red Wings were required to give compensation to the Los Angeles Kings, Vachon's former club. An arbitrator ruled that young centre Dale McCourt, whom the Red Wings had selected first overall in the 1977 NHL amateur draft, would go to the Kings. McCourt, who had led the Red Wings in scoring as a rookie in the 1977-78 season, refused to report to Los Angeles and sued the league.

In his first season with the Wings, Vachon allowed a goal more per game than he had the previous season, and in his second season he continued to struggle, posting numbers below his career averages. To his credit, he gained the distinction of recording the Red Wings' first victory in their new home, the Joe Louis Arena.

Boston Bruins

After two disappointing seasons in Detroit, the Red Wings traded Vachon to the Boston Bruins in the summer of 1980 for fellow netminder Gilles Gilbert. In Boston, Vachon served as a mentor to rookie goalies Marco Baron and Jim Craig, who had starred for the US National Team at the 1980 Winter Olympics. Vachon played 53 games for the Bruins and improved his numbers marginally from his time in Detroit; he also won more games than he lost for his first time since leaving Los Angeles.  However, in the playoffs, things went poorly as the Bruins were swept in three games by the Minnesota North Stars and surrendered twenty goals in the process.  Vachon allowed five goals in the first game, then gave up six in game two before getting pulled.  He gave up five more goals in game three and ended the playoffs with a 5.85 goals against average.  In the 1981-82 season, Baron took over the starting job from Vachon, who played 38 games as the back-up.  Vachon's final NHL appearance came in the 1982 playoffs, when he played one period in relief of starter Mike Moffat in a 7-2 loss to the Quebec Nordiques.  He faced just three shots in twenty minutes and allowed a power-play goal to Peter Stastny.  Vachon hung up his pads for good six days later.

Legacy
Known for his great reflexes and quick glove hand, Vachon was considered one of the premier one-on-one goaltenders of his era. He never allowed a goal on a penalty shot in his entire career.  After retiring, Vachon served as general manager of the Kings from 1984 to 1992.  He was the Kings' general manager in 1988 when they acquired Wayne Gretzky from the Edmonton Oilers. He also served as interim head coach of the Kings on three separate occasions. On June 27, 2016, Vachon was named an Honored Member of the Hockey Hall of Fame, and was inducted on November 14, 2016.

Personal life
Vachon had seven siblings and grew up on a dairy farm. He was persuaded to play senior level hockey at the age of 14 by a coach who was in need of a goaltender. He married Nicole Blanchard on November 30, 1971, and they had three children; Nicholas (who also played professional hockey), Jade and Marie-Joie, as well as three grandchildren. Nicole died from brain cancer in February 2016, after 44 years of marriage.

Achievements
Named to the QJHL first All-Star team in 1966.
Stanley Cup Championships in 1968, 1969, 1971.
Canada Cup Winner in 1976.
Vezina Trophy Winner in 1968.
Named to the Canada Cup All-Star team in 1976.
Named Team MVP during the 1976 Canada Cup.
Played in 1973, 1975, 1978 NHL All-Star Games.
Named to the NHL second All-Star team in 1975, 1977.
 #30 retired by the Los Angeles Kings.
Named to the Hockey Hall of Fame in the Players category in 2016.

Los Angeles Kings records
Most career games played by a goaltender (389) (later surpassed by Jonathan Quick).
Most minutes played (22,922) (later surpassed by Jonathan Quick).
Most career losses (148) (later surpassed by Jonathan Quick).
Most career ties (66) (shared with Kelly Hrudey).

Career statistics

Regular season and playoffs

International

Coaching record

See also
List of NHL goaltenders with 300 wins

References

External links
 

1945 births
Living people
Boston Bruins players
Canadian ice hockey coaches
Canadian ice hockey goaltenders
Detroit Red Wings players
Hockey Hall of Fame inductees
Houston Apollos players
Ice hockey people from Quebec
Los Angeles Kings coaches
Los Angeles Kings executives
Los Angeles Kings players
Montreal Canadiens players
Montreal Junior Canadiens players
National Hockey League players with retired numbers
People from Abitibi-Témiscamingue
Quebec Aces (AHL) players
Stanley Cup champions
Vezina Trophy winners